William d'Ecouis (sometimes referred to as William de Schoies) was an early Anglo-Norman baron, who is mentioned in the Domesday Book of 1086 as a substantial holder of land and manors.

William d'Ecouis founded Middleton castle, a motte-and-bailey fortress thought to be constructed from timber, the remains of which is a scheduled monument listed as Middleton Mound.

References

Norman conquest of England
1000s births
Year of death unknown
Anglo-Normans
People from King's Lynn and West Norfolk (district)